In Other Rooms, Other Wonders is a collection of short stories written by Pakistani-American author Daniyal Mueenuddin, who has also worked as a journalist, lawyer and a businessman. His book has won The Story Prize, the Commonwealth Writers' Prize and other honors and was a finalist for the 2010 Pulitzer Prize and the 2009 National Book Award.

Stories
 "Nawabdin Electrician"
 "Saleema"
 "Provide, Provide"
 "About a Burning Girl"
 "In Other Rooms, Other Wonders"
 "Our Lady of Paris"
 "Lily"
 "A Spoiled Man"

Summary
The stories uncovers a variegated society in which people's social status and expectations are understood without being explained, and in which the class system and poverty are shown to influence any decision made at a critical moment in the characters' lives. The book consists of eight linked stories written in Pakistan in the 1970s, '80s and '90s, and describe Pakistani culture from within.

Reviews
Sonny Mehta, editor-in-chief and chairman of Bertelsmann AG's Knopf Doubleday Publishing Group, says;

Poet and Writer Magazine writes;

References

External links
 Fora.TV-1
 Fora.TV-2

2009 short story collections
W. W. Norton & Company books